The 2012 Coleman Vision Tennis Championships was a professional tennis tournament played on hard courts. It was the fourteenth edition of the tournament which was part of the 2012 ITF Women's Circuit. It took place in Albuquerque, New Mexico, United States on September 17–23, 2012.

WTA entrants

Seeds 

 1 Rankings are as of September 10, 2012.

Other entrants 
The following players received wildcards into the singles main draw:
  Jennifer Elie
  Irina Falconi
  Asia Muhammad
  Allie Will

The following players received entry from the qualifying draw:
  Jan Abaza
  María Fernanda Álvarez Terán
  Adriana Pérez
  Sachia Vickery

Champions

Singles 

  Maria Sanchez def.  Lauren Davis, 6–1, 6–1

Doubles 

  Asia Muhammad /  Yasmin Schnack def.  Irina Falconi /  Maria Sanchez, 6–2, 1–6, [12–10]

External links 
 ITF Search
 Official site

 
Coleman Vision Tennis Championships
Coleman Vision Tennis Championships
Cole